Taeko is a Japanese female given name. 
It can have various meanings depending on the Kanji used. Possible writing include:

妙子 "mysterious child"
多恵子 "many blessings, child"

People
 Taeko Fukao, Japanese jazz singer
 Taeko Hattori (b. 1949), a Japanese stage, film, and television actress
 Taeko Ishikawa (b. 1975), Japanese softball player 
 Taeko Kawasumi (b. 1972), Japanese football player
 Taeko Kawata (b. 1965), a Japanese voice actress
 Taeko Kono (b. 1926), a Japanese novelist and essayist
 Taeko Kubo (b. 1949), Japanese diver
 Taeko Kunishima, Japanese jazz pianist
 Taeko Kuwata (b. 1945), half of the classical piano duo Duo Crommelynck
 Taeko Nakanishi (b. 1931), a Japanese voice actress
 Taeko Namba, a Japanese table tennis player
 Taeko Onuki (b. 1953), a Japanese singer
 Taeko Oyama (b. 1974), Japanese basketball player 
 Taeko Takeba (b. 1966), Japanese trap shooter
 Taeko Todo (b. 1968), Chinese-born table tennis
 Taeko Tomioka (b. 1935), a Japanese writer
 Tomiyama Taeko (1921–2021), Japanese visual artist 
 Taeko Udagawa (b. 1960), Japanese anthropologist
 Taeko Watanabe (b. 1960), a Japanese manga artist

Fictional
 Makioka Taeko in The Makioka Sisters (novel) by Jun'ichirō Tanizaki
 Taeko, the main character in the 1991 Studio Ghibli film Only Yesterday
 Taeko Hiramatsu, a character in the light novel series Kore wa Zombie Desu ka?
 Taeko Minazuki, a character in the series Ai Yori Aoshi
 Taeko Ishiki, captain of Nadeshiko Japan in Area no Kishi 
 Taeko Yasuhiro, aka Celestia Ludenberg, a student in Danganronpa: Trigger Happy Havoc
 Taeko Takeda, one of the major characters in the 2014 series of novels 'The Desolate Tree' by Raphael Sangorski
 Hirata Taeko, character in Laura Joh Rowland's Sano Ichiro series. Daughter of Sano's chief retainer Hirata and his wife Niu Midori, conceived out of wedlock, makes first appearance in "The Dragon King's Palace".
 Taeko Yamada, a female version of Taro Yamada in Yandere Simulator

Japanese feminine given names